Rollingwood is a city in Travis County, Texas, United States. Part of the  metropolitan area, the population was 1,467 at the 2020 census.

Geography

Rollingwood is located at  (30.274657, –97.784501), 3 miles (5 km) west of downtown Austin.

According to the United States Census Bureau, the city has a total area of 0.7 square miles (1.8 km2), all of it land.

Demographics

As of the 2020 United States census, there were 1,467 people, 473 households, and 375 families residing in the city.

At the 2000 census there were 1,403 people in 489 households, including 413 families, in the city. The population density was 2,070.7 people per square mile (796.6/km2). There were 498 housing units at an average density of 735.0/sq mi (282.8/km2).  The racial makeup of the city was 96.01% White, 0.21% Native American, 2.28% Asian, 0.50% from other races, and 1.00% from two or more races. Hispanic or Latino of any race were 4.92%.

Of the 489 households 45.2% had children under the age of 18 living with them, 74.8% were married couples living together, 7.6% had a female householder with no husband present, and 15.5% were non-families. 12.9% of households were one person and 6.1% were one person aged 65 or older. The average household size was 2.87 and the average family size was 3.15.

The age distribution was 29.8% under the age of 18, 4.6% from 18 to 24, 21.7% from 25 to 44, 32.4% from 45 to 64, and 11.4% 65 or older. The median age was 42 years. For every 100 females, there were 98.7 males. For every 100 females age 18 and over, there were 90.5 males.

The median household income was $108,835 and the median family income  was $117,851. Males had a median income of $86,197 versus $43,125 for females. The per capita income for the city was $52,280. About 0.5% of families and 0.5% of the population were below the poverty line, including 0.5% of those under age 18 and none of those age 65 or over.

References

External links
 

Cities in Travis County, Texas
Cities in Texas
Cities in Greater Austin